Stefano Cagol (Trento, September 11, 1969) is an Italian contemporary artist living in Italy, Germany and Norway. He works with video, photography and installation and performance art in the fields of conceptual art, environmental art / eco art and land art, and has reflected for years on borders, viruses, flags  and climate issues.

Life
Cagol was born in Trento. He studied at the Institute of Art in Trento, the Academy of Fine Arts in Brera, Milan and at the Ryerson Polytechnical Institute in Toronto, where he was a post-doctoral fellow. He also attended the Internationale Sommerakademie für Bildende Kunst in Salzburg and the ICP-International Center of Photography in New York. He was artist in residence at the Künstlerhaus in Salzburg, at the Leube Group Art's Program of Gartenau, Austria, at the IOR in London in 2003 and in 2005, at International Studio & Curatorial Program (ISCP) , New York, in 2010, and at BAR International by Pikene på Broen, in Kirkenes, Norway, between 2010 and 2011. In 1998 he took part in the Marshall McLuhan Program in Culture and Technology in Toronto.

Exhibitions
Cagol held a solo show at MART - Museum of Modern and Contemporary Art of Trento and Rovereto in 2000, curated by Gabriella Belli. His public art intervention "Artists' bridges" took place in Bolzano 2002. In 2004, he exhibited at Superdeluxe in Tokyo and the Stefan Stux Gallery project room in New York. In June–September 2005 he realized a solo exhibition, "Babylon Zoo" at the Oredaria Gallery in Rome (with a critical essay by Pier Luigi Tazzi), and a site specific installation in the hall of the Faculty of Sociology in Trento. In January 2005 he held a solo exhibition in London at Platform titled "LIES" (catalogue with a critical essay by Mami Kataoka).

In 2006, he exhibited "Power Station" as an official satellite project of the Singapore Biennale (the only Italian presence) and "Bird Flu / Vogelgrippe" as special project of 4th Berlin Biennale, supported by the Civic Gallery of Contemporary Art in Trento, Museion, the Museum of Modern and Contemporary Art of Bolzano and the Kunstraum of Innsbruck, Austria.

In 2007, he completed a solo public art installation for the façade of the BeursSchouwburg art center in Brussels (on view from 2007 till 2012).
In the same year he realized a project - together with Stealth.ultd, Rotterdam - at Kunst Merano Arte for “From & to,” a solo public art intervention in Venice called "Head Flu,” and a solo show at NADiff - New Art Diffusion, Tokyo.

In 2008, he realized a Parallel Event to Manifesta 7, a special project for the farewell event of Jan Hoet at MARTa Herford in Germany, a public art installation on Petřín Tower at Tina B contemporary art festival in Prague. During the same year he took part in "Eurasia" at Museum of Modern and Contemporary Art of Trento and Rovereto, in “Arrivals and Departures” at White Box, New York city, in “The Peekskill Project” at HVCCA – Hudson Valley Center for Contemporary Art, New York.

In 2009, he presented his solo project “11 settembre” simultaneously at MART – Museum of Modern and Contemporary Art of Trento and Rovereto, at Kunstraum Innsbruck, and at ZKM Karlsruhe, where the artwork became part of the collection. With Error One, he realized a public art installation at MuHKA in Antwerp.
On September he was announced as winner of the Terna Prize 02 – for the Megawatt category.

In 2010, he exhibited at the Paul Robeson Gallery of Rutgers University in Newark in “Bittersweet”, at the Other Gallery in Shanghai in “Suspension of Disbilief”, at Palazzo della Triennale in Milan, at SUPEC – Shanghai Urban Planning Exhibition Center.

In 2011, he held a solo show at Priska C. Juschka Fine Art in New York titled “Stockholm Syndrome”.
He took part in 54. International Art Exhibition – La Biennale di Venezia with an official collateral event / solo show “CONCILIO” curated by Gregor Jansen at San Gallo Church.

His project “The End of the Border (of the mind),” commissioned by the Barents Art Triennale at the extreme northern border of Norway, had its start from the Vajont dam in Italy in the fifth anniversary of the tragedy and developed as a trip / expedition in March and April 2012.

He took part in 55. International Art Exhibition – La Biennale di Venezia with the project “The Ice Monolith” part of the Maldives Pavilion curated by CPS Chamber of Public Secrets at Gervasuti Foundation, Venezia. In 2014 he took part in Critical ways of seeing at Goldsmiths (University of London).

Cagol wins in 2014 VISIT Artist in residence program of the German Innogy Stiftung, former RWE Foundation, with the trans-national project THE BODY OF ENERGY, that develops between museums and power plants between 2014 and 2015.

As winner of the Italian Council 2019  he realized an international project titled "The Time of the Flood. Beyond the myth through climate change"  btw Berlin, Tel Aviv, Roma, Venice and Vienna  promoted and supported by Ministry of Culture (Italy) MIBAC.

In 2022 he realized a performance at the Kunstmuseum Wolfsburg  as part of the exhibition “Power! Light!,” the solo screening “Far Before and After Us” at Kunsthall 3.14  in Bergen and participated in “Pear + Flora + Fauna. The Story of Indigenousness and the Ownership of History,” Perak-Malaysia State Pavilion, a collateral event of the 59th Venice Biennale .

Public collections
Works by Stefano Cagol are in the collections of Videoteca of GAM, Torino, MART - Museum of Modern and Contemporary Art of Trento and Rovereto, Fondazione Galleria Civica-Center of Research on Contemporaneity of Trento, Unicredit, Terna Group, Seat, Nomas Foundation, ZKM Center for Art and Media Karlsruhe, Museion (Bozen), Federal Ministry of the Environment, Nature Conservation and Nuclear Safety.

References

Books
Angela Madesani, "Le icone fluttuanti. Storia del cinema d'artista e della videoarte", Bruno Mondadori, Milan, 2002
"Dizionario della Giovane Arte 1", Politi, Milan, 2003
"Enciclopedia dell'arte Zanichelli", Zanichelli, Milan, 2004
"L'Arte contemporanea italiana nel mondo", Skira / operaDarc, Milan, 2005
Alessandra Vaccari, "Wig Wag", Marsilio / Pitti Immagine Discovery, Venice, 2005
"Singapore Biennale: Belief", National Arts Council, Singapore, 2006
Stefan Bidner, Angelique Campens, David Elliott, Andrea Lissoni, Roberto Pinto, "Stefano Cagol: Harajuku Influences", Charta, Milan, 2007
Achille Bonito Oliva, "Eurasia", MART – Museum of Modern and Contemporary Art of Trento and Rovereto, Skira, Milan, 2008
Goetz Adriani, Gregor Jansen, Peter Weibel, "Just what is it..., 10 Jahre Museum für Neue Kunst im ZKM", Hatje Cantz Verlag, Stuttgart, 2009
Iara Boubnova, Stefano Cagol, Gregor Jansen, Michele Robecchi, Andrea Viliani, "Stefano Cagol. Public Opinion", Charta, Milan, 2011
Stefan Bidner, "Kunstraum Innsbruck 2004–2010", Verlag Walther König, Köln, 2011
"Illuminations. 54th International Art Exhibition of the Venice Biennale", Marsilio, Venice, 2011
Dorian Batycka, Camilla Boemio, Alfredo Cramerotti, Aida Eltoire, "Portable Nation. Maldives Pavilion", Maretti, 2013
"Il Palazzo Enciclopedico. 55th International Art Exhibition of the Venice Biennale", Marsilio, Venezia, 2013
Veit Loers, Daniela Berglehn, Andreas Beitin, Tobia Bezzola, Giovanni Carmine, Letizia Ragaglia, Andrea Viliani, "The Body of Energy (of the mind)", Revolver Publishing, Berlin, 2015
Julie Reiss, (edited by), "Art, theory and practice in the Anthropocene", Vernon Press, Wilmington, 2019
Stefano Cagol, Giorgia Calò, Elisa Carollo, Alessandro Castiglioni, Mareike Dittmer, Silvana Greco, Rachel Rits-Volloch, Nicola Trezzi, "The Time of the Flood (Beyond the myth through climate change)", Postmedia books, Milan, 2021
Andreas Beitin (edited by), Ulrike Gehring et. al.,"Power! Light!", Verlag der Buchhandlung Walther und Franz König, Köln, 2022

Reviews
“Bird Flu se desplaza por Europa,” Lapiz # 223, Madrid, May 2006, p. 18
Roberto Pinto, “Stefano Cagol,” Work. Art In progress # 16, Trento, Summer 2006, pp. 50–51, 70-73
Luigi Meneghelli,”Stefano Cagol,” Flash Art Italia # 261, Milan, Dec. 2006 – Jan. 2007, p. 73
June Yap, “Stefano Cagol; To the casual observer," Contemporary # 91, London, May 2007, p. 28–31
Benjamin Genocchio, “In Peekskill, 2 Shows of Raw Works,” The New York Times, New York, Sept 28 2008
Robert Ayers, “Wild Animals Invade the New York Art World,” Artinfo, New York, April 2008
Felicitas Rhan, “Die Mutter aller Daten,” interview, monopol-magazin.de, Berlin, Sept 11 2009
Francesca Pini, “L’arte del mondo arriva a Venezia ed è Biennale,” Sette – Corriere della Sera # 21, Milan, May 26, 2011, p. 76-77
Laura Larcan, “Eventi collaterali e contromostre. L’altra Biennale della Serenissima,” La Repubblica, Rome, May 27, 2011
"54. Biennale di Venezia. An international plaza,” Lapiz # 267, Madrid, 2011, p. 33-41
Ann Lisbeth Hemmingsen, “Til grensens ytterkant,” Kunstforum, Oslo, March 22, 2013
Joan Karsbakk, “Lighting up European borders,” Barents Observer, Kirkenes, March 22, 2013
Luciana Parisi, “TG3,” Rai 3, Rome, March 7, h 19, 2013
Holly Howe, "How this year’s Venice Biennale made us think about climate change," fadwebsite.com, London, July 26, 2013
Claudia Jolles, "Editorial: Venice Biennale", Kunst Bulletin, Zurich, #7-8/2013, p. 3 and cover
Mariella Rossi, “Nuestro mundo es finite. Our world is finite,” Lapiz, #279, Madrid 2013
Georgina Adam, "New economies shake up the art world at Venice Biennale," "BBC", June 11, 2013
Michela Moro, “Speciale Biennale,” "Cool Tour. Rai 5, June 1, 2013
Artan Krasniqi, “Bienalja si enciklopedi e hapur e artit,” Koha, June 1, 2013
Kathleen Massara, “Venice Biennale 2013 Photo Diary,” Huffingtonpost, May 29, 31, 2013
Holland Cotter, “Snapshots from Venice,” The New York Times, May 29, 2013
Tom Jeffreys, “Artistic tales of Earth’s two thawing poles,” The New Scientist, London, UK, Jan 24, 2014
Bettina Bush, "In quelle segrete diventa arte il vuoto della Shoah," Repubblica. Genova, 24 Jan, 2015
Anna Saba Didonato, “Un viaggio lungo sei mesi per dar corpo all’energia”, Il Giornale dell’Arte. Arte e Imprese, Sept 2014  
Saul Marcadent "Be-diversity," Pizza, July 31, 2015          
Thale Fastvold,“Green Art,” Kunst, #2, Oslo, Norway, 2015
Lisa Paul Streitfeld, "(R)evolution in Berlin: Stefano Cagol's Body of Energy," HuffPost. Arts & Culture, 23 Nov, 2015
Daniele Capra. "Un raggio di luce sparato sui blocchi," Il Manifesto, June 5, 2016  
Alessia Rastelli, "Il risveglio degli stati nazionali," La Lettura, Corriere della Sera, Milano, 24 July, 2016
Francesca Pini, "Sulle montagne il ricordo della Grande Guerra," in Sette, Corriere della Sera, 19 Aug, 2016    
Michela Moro, "Teoria della relatività del vuoto," Il Giornale dell'arte, online, 5 Oct, 2017
Glenda Cinquegrana,"L'artista dell'invisibile," FORBES LIFE. Forbes Italia, #2, Dec 2017
Licia Raimondi, "Palermo: la cassata-drone simbolo di riflessione artistica", in La Repubblica Palermo.it, 17 June, 2018
Hedwig Kainberger, "Kunst kann den Wert von Geld vermehren", in Salzburger Nachrichten, Salzburg, 28 Aug, 2018
Maria Rosa Pavia, "Manifesta 12 a Palermo tra data center e droni, arte vs tecnologia. Dalla guerra al gioco", in Corriere Innovazione, Corriere della Sera, Milano, 18 Sept, 2018
"Stefano Cagol porta The Body of Energy alla Reggia di Caserta", in Il Mattino, 14 Nov, 2018
"La monumentale opera video di Cagol a Caserta", in Artribune, 22 Nov, 2018
"Stefano Cagol, artista trentino che illumina la Reggia di Caserta", in TGR Trento, Rai, 19 Nov, 2018
Alexis Caraco, "Alpine festival shines a light on climate change", in Euronews, 13 May, 2019
Francesca Pini, "Il monolite di ghiaccio, monito alla fragilità. L’arte milita nel verde", in Corriere della Sera - Sette, 14 June, 2019
Santa Nastro, "L’artista globetrotter. Intervista a Stefano Cagol", Artribune, 20 June, 2019
Arianna Voto, "Invitato speciale: ghiacciai malati. Intervista a Stefano Cagol", in Radio Rai, 28 Sept, 2019
Manuela De Leonardis, "Essenza di un viaggio: multivisioni tra confini, ecologia ed energia", in l’Extraterrestre, Il Manifesto, 5 Sept, 2019 
"A Room with a View: Stefano Cagol on his isolation experience", in My Art Guides, 6 April, 2020
Lorenza Barracca, "Tu da che parte stai riguardo il problema ambientale? Ecco l’arte di Cagol che tenta di sensibilizzare", in Il Supernuovo, 14 May, 2020
Ellen Schattschneider, Mark Auslander, "Emergency Flares: Stefano Cagol", in Art Beyond Quarantine, 21 May, 2020
Ilaria Zampieri, "Mito del diluvio e purificazione. Intervista a Stefano Cagol", in Exibart, 18 Sept, 2020
Azzurra Immediato, "Explorations: Stefano Cagol", in Ottica Contemporanea, 5 Oct, 2020
Alessandro Castiglioni, Iniziare dall’acqua, in Riflesso, 28 Oct, 2020
Daniel Lichterwaldt, "Interview. Italian artist Stefano Cagol", in Le Nouveaux Riches magazine, 4 Nov, 2020
"The Time of the Flood: an interview with artist Stefano Cagol on his exhibition at CCA Tel Aviv", in My Art Guides, 2 Dec, 2020
Valentina Gioia Levy, "Art talks: Stefano Cagol", in The Collector #6, June, 2021
Christina Burghagen, "Historisch – Zeitgenössisch", Wochen-Zeitung CH,  12 Aug, 2021
Francesca Pini, Cult. "Performance: Stefano Cagol", in Sette, Corriere della Sera, 10 Dec, 2021

Notes

External links

Official site, 1996-now
VIR Viafarini-in-residence, Open Studio, 2013
3 September 2016 - MANIFESTA 11, Zürich, 2016
The Body of Energy, 2014-now
ZKM Karlsruhe, 2009-2015
Project at Venice Biennale, 2013
Project at Barents Art Triennale, 2012-2013
Project at Venice Biennale 2011, 2011
September 11 project, 2009
Off-site project at Berlin Biennale, 2006
Project at Singapore Biennale, 2006
Projects in progress with flags, 2005-2006

Italian digital artists
Italian contemporary artists
1969 births
Living people
Brera Academy alumni